Caularisia is a genus of moths of the family Noctuidae, containing only a single species, Caularisia zikani, from Brazil.

References

Agaristinae
Monotypic moth genera
Moths described in 1933